Hylte Municipality (Hylte kommun) is the only inland municipality of Halland County in southwest Sweden. The industrial town  Hyltebruk is the seat of the municipality.

The first Hylte Municipality was created in 1952 through the amalgamation of three minor units in Jönköping County. In 1974 further amalgamations took place and the county boundary was redrawn.

Geography 
The municipality straddles the boundary of two historic provinces, Halland and Småland.

Localities 
There are 6 urban areas (also called a Tätort or locality) in Hylte Municipality.

In the table the localities are listed according to the size of the population as of December 31, 2005. The municipal seat is in bold characters.

References 

Statistics Sweden

External links 

Hylte Municipality - Official site

Municipalities of Halland County